{{DISPLAYTITLE:C27H29N5O3}}
The molecular formula C27H29N5O3 (molar mass: 471.55 g/mol) may refer to:

 5'-Guanidinonaltrindole (5'-GNTI)
 6'-Guanidinonaltrindole (6'-GNTI)
 Zanubrutinib